Dietheria is a genus of Tephritid or fruit flies in the family Tephritidae.

References

Dacinae
Tephritidae genera